Denise Jones Ennett is an American politician. She is a Democrat currently serving as a member of the Arkansas House of Representatives from the 36th district, having assumed office in 2019 after winning a special election.

Career

Arkansas House of Representatives 
Ennett was first elected in a 2019 special election following the resignation of Charles Blake to work for the mayor of Little Rock, beating Darrell Stephens in a runoff election. She serves on the House Public Transportation Committee as well as the House Committee on Agriculture, Forestry and Economic Development and the Joint Committee on Advanced Communications and Information Technology.

Feminine hygiene products 
In January 2021, Ennett co-sponsored a bill that would exempt items such as tampons, menstrual cups, and other products related to feminine hygiene  from sales and use taxes in Arkansas. Ennett also sponsored a bill that allowed Arkansas public schools to use their funding to purchase feminine hygiene products and distribute them to students at no cost. The latter bill was approved and signed into law.

Discrimination against disabled people 
Ennett co-sponsored a bill that was termed "Lila's law", after a girl who was denied a heart transplant in 2018 due to her having Down syndrome. The bill prohibited discrimination against people with disabilities when seeking an organ transplant, and was signed in to law on April 22, 2021.

Black Lives Matter protest 
In June 2020, Ennett attended a Black Lives Matter protest in Little Rock, Arkansas, during the fifth consecutive night of protests in front of the Arkansas State Capitol. Ennett told reporters that she felt that she had to protest to ensure the well-being of her children.

Personal life 
Ennett is married to a veteran of the United States Air Force, and has three children. They live in Little Rock.

Electoral history

2020

2019

References 

Living people
Democratic Party members of the Arkansas House of Representatives
Year of birth missing (living people)
University of Arkansas at Little Rock alumni
University of Texas at Arlington alumni